Erlewine is a surname. Notable people with the surname include:

 May Erlewine (born 1983), American musician
 Michael Erlewine (born 1941), American musician, TV host, Internet entrepreneur, and founder of All Music Guide
 Stephen Thomas Erlewine (born 1973), American music critic and senior editor for AllMusic